Fightback is a beat 'em up video game developed by Ninja Theory and published by Chillingo for iOS in 2013, and for Android in 2014.

Reception

The iOS version received "mixed" reviews according to the review aggregation website Metacritic.

References

External links
 

2013 video games
Android (operating system) games
Beat 'em ups
Chillingo games
IOS games
Ninja Theory games
Video games developed in the United Kingdom
Single-player video games